Pinna bicolor is a species of bivalves belonging to the family Pinnidae.

The species is found in Indian Ocean, Malesia, Pacific Ocean.

References

Pinnidae